Taraka Brahma Mantra (Sanskrit: तारकब्रह्ममन्त्र) or Taraka Brahma Naam is the Mahamantra of every Yuga according to the Yuga Cycle of Hinduism. Mantras are all enshrined in Vedic literature. These are the various "Taraka Brahma Naams" assigned to the four Yugas, and the Hare Krishna Mahamantra is assigned to this Kali Yuga. 
The Hare Krishna Mantra is composed of the three Sanskrit names of the Supreme Being – Hare, Krishna and Rama.

Mantras
According to Gauda Govinda Maharaja's book "Sudha Naam Bhajan", the "Taraka Brahma Mantra" of Four Yugas are:

See also
 Yuga dharma
 Hare Krishna
 Mantra

References

External links
 THE YUGA-DHARMA AND THE HARE KRSNA MAHAMANTRA 
 Taraka Brahma Nama (The Holy Name which Delivers All), Sunday, 27 November 2011

Hindu mantras